Ai apaec (from the Mochica Aiapæc [a.ja.pøk] or [aiapøk]), was the chief deity of the Mochica culture. The most feared and adored of all punitive gods, it was also referred to as the “headsman”. Ai Apaec was worshipped as the creator god, protector of the Moche, a provider of water, food and military triumphs. Aiapaec means 'maker' in the Mochica language.

Representations

The most common representation of Ai Apaec is the one seen in the murals of the Temples of the Sun and the Moon, which present an anthropomorphic face with feline fangs, surrounded by ocean waves.
 
Ai apaec was represented in several ways, depending on the period, place, and medium used.  In metallurgy, for example, Ai apaec is often seen as a spider with eight legs and an anthropomorphic face with jaguar fangs. In ceramics the divinity is often more anthropomorphic, usually with his head in his hands and sometimes with two snakes sprouting from his head. In sculpture he is shown with a staff.
 
It is said that during human sacrifices, prisoners were decapitated and their heads given to Ai apaec.

In popular culture
Ai Apaec is a villain in the Marvel Universe.  He is depicted as having the torso of a human male (with snakes for hair and large fangs) with the lower body of an enormous spider.  Recruited by Norman Osborn, he is given a special serum that changes him into a six armed version of Spider-Man.  In this form, he serves a member of Osborn's second version of the Dark Avengers.  He first appeared in Osborn #1 (2011). He also makes an appearance during the "Spider-Island" saga. In "Spider-Verse", a version of Ai Apaec from Earth-1771 was consumed by the Inheritor Karn after being exiled from his family.

In Archie Comics' New Crusaders, Ai Apaec is depicted as a jaguar god who empowers the superhero Jaguar.

See also
Cultural depictions of spiders
El Brujo
Moche culture
Huanchaco
Trujillo, Peru
Ai Apaec (comics)

References 

 Art of the Andes, from Chavin to Inca. Rebecca Stone Miller, Thames and Hudson, 1995.
 The Incas and their Ancestors. Michael E. Moseley, Thames and Hudson, 1992.

External links

  — a Museo Larco media presentation 
 www.huacas.com
 Sun and Moon Official Project information

Moche sites
Moche culture
Mythological spiders